Dolores Merendón is a municipality in the Honduran department of Ocotepeque.

Demographics
At the time of the 2013 Honduras census, Dolores Merendón municipality had a population of 3,742. Of these, 99.65% were Mestizo, 0.21% Black or Afro-Honduran and 0.13% White.

References

Municipalities of the Ocotepeque Department